North Mountain and Shaw Butte are two adjacent mountains in the Phoenix Mountains Preserve in Phoenix, Arizona.
The two mountains lie to the south of Thunderbird Road, north of Hatcher Road, east of North 19th Avenue, and west of North Cave Creek Road.

External links
 Phoenix Mountains Preservation Council
 Map of North Mountain/Shaw Butte Preserve

Parks in Phoenix, Arizona